The Highlands is a neighborhood and unincorporated district in San Mateo County, California, United States. It is bordered by Interstate 280 to the west, State Route 92 to the south, Polhemus Road to the east, and Crystal Springs Road, which parallels San Mateo Creek, to the north. The town of Hillsborough is just north of the Highlands and the city of Belmont is to the south.

Geography

The Highlands is known for its scenic views. The stunning geographical features and proximity to two major highways (Interstate 280 and State Route 92) make the Highlands both very attractive and convenient.

The Highlands sits on top of Pulgas Ridge, west of the city of San Mateo overlooking the Lower Crystal Springs Reservoir which lies just to the west and straddles the San Andreas fault. The Cahill Ridge of Montara Mountain lies just to the west of Crystal Springs and gives a dramatic view to the west side of the Highlands. The east side of the Highlands offers beautiful unobstructed views of San Francisco Bay, the San Mateo Bridge, and on clear days, Mount Diablo in Contra Costa County.

On three sides, the Highlands is surrounded by open space, with canyons to the north and east and a more gentle sloping hillside to the west.

Climate
Due to its location on the top of a ridge, near the gap in the Santa Cruz Mountains where SR 92 transects the mountains, the Highlands receives a good deal of foggy weather as hot dry air in the Central Valley pulls cool, moist air off the Pacific Ocean. Temperatures in the Highlands are typically five to ten degrees (F) colder than cities just to the south of the SR 92 gap.

Recreation
The Highlands Recreation District was formed in 1957 with an elected Board of Directors. In 1958 they began construction on building the facilities, and now offer a year-round swimming pool, tennis courts, playground, community social room, and gym. The Recreation District offers children's programs from infant and toddler day care to teen cooking classes as well as adult educational and community programs.

The Highlands is also very close to Sawyer Camp Trail and many residents are able to jog or bike to the trail from their homes. The trail runs for 6 miles (10 km) along the Lower Crystal Springs Reservoir and offers scenic views, wildlife and safe paved trails for jogging, biking, walking, roller blading, and bicycling. Cañada Road, which runs parallel to I-280, is also easily reached by joggers and bicyclists from the Highlands. Cañada Road is closed to traffic on Sundays from March to October to allow safe jogging, walking, bicycling or roller blading with scenic views of Upper Crystal Springs Reservoir. The area is adjacent to Pulgas Ridge Open Space Preserve, which also includes hiking trails.

History and architecture

The Highlands was developed as a working-class neighborhood in the mid 1950s. Developer Joseph Eichler, between 1956 and 1964, built most of the homes using a Modernist style now called "California Modern", inspired by Frank Lloyd Wright. The homes are post and beam construction featuring much glass, skylights, and atria. Most have a flat or gently sloped roof and in-floor radiant heating. Many of the neighborhood homes retain their original exterior form and are sought after by enthusiasts of Modern architecture. The neighborhood also includes the experimental X-100, one of only two Eichler houses built using steel rather than timber, as well as Eichlers with additions or other modifications from their original form and homes built by other developers in more traditional styles.

Adjacent to the Highlands neighborhood is a large, undeveloped parcel of land that is zoned as a Resource Management district by San Mateo County. Highlands residents have been fighting development of this parcel for over two decades. Many residents of the Highlands feel that the open space surrounding the Highlands is one of the many charms that makes the neighborhood unique and highly valued and do not wish to see further development there. Additionally many are concerned about the safety of building on the steep hillsides that comprise the parcel. Recent recommendations by the San Mateo County Planning Commission related to development on this parcel may have much wider implications for similarly zoned parcels across the county.

In prior years there has also been vigorous debate in the Highlands about changing the zoning laws to restrict development or alteration of original Eichler homes to a single story. Authority over zoning in the Highlands is held by the San Mateo County Board of Supervisors. Current zoning allows for homes up to 36 ft. high (up to three stories). The original single-story Eichlers are 9 to 11 ft. high while two-story homes in the neighborhood by other developers reach up to 23 feet in height. The neighborhood includes over 700 single-story Eichler homes, a handful of original two-story Eichler homes built up against steep hillsides, and 55 later 2nd story additions (remodels).

Community

The Highlands Community Association is a volunteer-run community association. It is not a homeowners association and, as such, does not have authority to set laws or policies in the neighborhood. Membership in the Highlands Community Association requires a nominal fee. The Association publishes a monthly newsletter, the Highlands Lowdown, which has been in continuous publication since 1954.

The Association also sponsors an annual 4th of July festival, begun and continuously run since 1960. The 4th of July festival includes a parade and fireworks display on the evening of July 3. The fireworks display is intended for the Highlands community only, not outside guests. Following the parade on the morning of July 4 are other activities including a water carnival with swim races, arcade games, food, a foot race and other activities.

The United Methodist Church in the Highlands offers community discussions, day care services and has an active theater group known as the Crystal Springs Players.

References

TopoQuest topographic map
Commission sides with highlands residents

External links
Highlands Community Association

Neighborhoods in San Mateo County, California
Geography of San Mateo County, California